François Michel Marie Ignace Caron (b. 6 August 1937) is a French Navy officer and historian.

Biography 
Caron was born to the family of a Navy captain, and joined the École navale in 1957. 

He captained several submarines before becoming first officer on the missile destroyer Duquesne, and later captain of the T 53-class destroyer La Galissonnière.  

He retired with the rank of contre-amiral.

Works

Sources and references 
 Notes

Citations

External links
 
 

French Navy officers